Dale Quarterley (born January 25, 1961) is an American professional stock car racing driver who competes part-time in the NASCAR Craftsman Truck Series, driving the No. 46 Toyota Tundra for G2G Racing. He also competes for his own team, 1/4 Ley Racing, part-time in the ARCA Menards Series, driving the No. 4 Chevrolet SS, and part-time in the ARCA Menards Series West, driving the No. 32 Chevrolet SS. He has also competed in the AMA Superbike Series and is the only driver to have won multiple championships in the series.

Racing career

NASCAR and ARCA

Quarterley's NASCAR career started in 1994, when he began competing in what was then known as the NASCAR Busch North Series. He entered his car in a race at Lime Rock Park, finishing 12th.

Quarterley continued making sporadic Busch North starts before running the full season for the first time in 1999. He scored his first win at Beech Ridge Motor Speedway, leading all but two laps. In 2002, Quarterley nearly won at Watkins Glen International, winning the pole and leading the most laps. However, he ran out of fuel during a green-white-checker finish.

Quarterley eventually scaled back to a part-time schedule. Despite originally announcing plans to run the West Series race at Sonoma, he sat out the entire 2007 season. During the season, he served as crew chief for John Salemi.

In 2008, Quarterley drove two road course races on back-to-back weekends in the renamed Nationwide Series for Mike Harmon Racing. He finished 42nd and 41st at Circuit Gilles Villeneuve and Watkins Glen respectively.

Quarterley's 2011 season was highlighted by a second-place finish at Dover International Speedway. He was later fined, however, for a shock absorber violation on his car.

In 2018, Quarterley returned to the K&N Pro Series East after a two-year absence to compete for NextGen Motorsports in the JustDrive.com 125. He qualified 15th and finished 13th, dropping out after 43 laps with rear-end problems on the car.

To date, Quarterley has scored a total of 6 wins in the East Series.

Quarterley returned to the ARCA Menards Series in 2021, driving the No. 3 car for Mullins Racing at the Watkins Glen road course.

In 2022, Quarterly drove in the main ARCA Series season-opener at Daytona in the No. 5 car for Bobby Gerhart Racing and in the road course races in the main ARCA Series and the West Series for his own team, 1/4 Ley Racing, in the No. 32 car although for the main ARCA Series race at Watkins Glen, AM Racing entered the race with their No. 32 car driven by Austin Wayne Self and Quarterley and his team ran the No. 4 instead. 

On January 28, 2023, Quarterley announced that he would attempt to make his Truck Series debut in the race at COTA for his own team after buying an old Toyota from Kyle Busch Motorsports, which switched to Chevrolet for 2023. He stated in an interview with Frontstretch that although the plan is to drive for his own team, it is possible that he could partner with another team with owner points and drive for them to have a better chance of qualifying for the race. He will also return to run the road course races in the main ARCA Series and the West Series plus the main ARCA Series season-opener at Daytona, after purchasing a former superspeedway car from GMS Racing. He will also run the two main ARCA Series dirt races for the first time after buying the assets of Hendren Motorsports, which closed down after fielding a car for Ryan Unzicker, who won at Springfield in 2020 and DuQuoin in 2022, in those races for several years.

Motorcycle racing
In the AMA Superbike Championship, Quarterley is the only multi-time champion in the series. He raced a Kawasaki Ninja for Mirage under the Mutant Ninja Turtles flag.

Motorsports career results

NASCAR
(key) (Bold – Pole position awarded by qualifying time. Italics – Pole position earned by points standings or practice time. * – Most laps led.)

Nextel Cup Series

Nationwide Series

Craftsman Truck Series

K&N Pro Series East

Whelen Modified Tour

Whelen Euro Series – Elite 1

ARCA Menards Series
(key) (Bold – Pole position awarded by qualifying time. Italics – Pole position earned by points standings or practice time. * – Most laps led.)

ARCA Menards Series West

Rolex Sports Car Series
(key) (Races in bold indicate pole position, Results are overall/class)

References

External links
 
 

Living people
NASCAR drivers
1961 births
ARCA Menards Series drivers
People from Westfield, Massachusetts
Racing drivers from Massachusetts